Josué Misael Domínguez González (born 27 October 1999) is a Mexican professional footballer who plays as a winger for Liga MX club Tijuana.

Club career

C.F. Monterrey
Born in Saltillo, Dominguez began playing professional football with Monterrey, where he participated in the 2016–17 CONCACAF Champions League group stage against Don Bosco FC. Domínguez was loaned out to Cruz Azul in July for the rest of the year. On July 21, 2018, Dominguez debuted for Cruz Azul coming in as a substitute. At the 93rd minute, Dominguez assisted Elías Hernández in the 3rd goal in a 3–0 victory against Puebla.

Cruz Azul
Cruz Azul signed him permanently after the loan deal expired, for US$1.5 million.

International career
On 25 October 2018, Domínguez was called up by Diego Ramírez to participate in that year's CONCACAF U-20 Championship. As Mexico would go on and finish runner-up in the tournament. In April 2019, Domínguez was included in the 21-player squad to represent Mexico at the U-20 World Cup in Poland.

Career statistics

Club

Honours
Cruz Azul
Liga MX: Guardianes 2021
Copa MX: Apertura 2018
Supercopa MX: 2019
Leagues Cup: 2019

References

External links
 

1999 births
Living people
Association football midfielders
C.F. Monterrey players
Cruz Azul footballers
Liga MX players
Tercera División de México players
Footballers from Coahuila
Mexican footballers
Sportspeople from Saltillo
Mexico under-20 international footballers